Miloš Vratič (born 11 May 1948) is a Slovenian gymnast. He competed at the 1968 Summer Olympics and the 1972 Summer Olympics.

References

1948 births
Living people
Slovenian male artistic gymnasts
Olympic gymnasts of Yugoslavia
Gymnasts at the 1968 Summer Olympics
Gymnasts at the 1972 Summer Olympics
Sportspeople from Ljubljana